Matsukawaya Co., Ltd. is a Japanese confectionery company that makes .

History

It was founded in 1862 in Nagoya, Japan. Currently, Yoshitaka Nishino is the CEO.

References

Manufacturing companies based in Nagoya
Japanese brands
Wagashi
Japanese companies established in 1862